Hisel is a village and a former municipality in the district of Bitburg-Prüm, in Rhineland-Palatinate, western Germany. Since January 2018, it is part of the municipality Brimingen.

References

Bitburg-Prüm
Former municipalities in Rhineland-Palatinate